The Metropolitan Police Act 1887 (50 and 51 Vict, c.45) was one of the last of the Metropolitan Police Acts.

The Act modified Section 3 of the Metropolitan Police Act 1886, allowing the Receiver of the Metropolitan Police to take out loans up to a total of £500,000 (Section 2.1) and banning the lender from inquiring as to the purpose of the loan (Section 2.3). It also added buying fittings and furniture for a central police office to the possible reasons allowed for a loan, but added the proviso that all loans for such purchases had to be paid back within 15 years (Section 2.2). It also granted the Receiver the power to grant leases on lands held by him but not immediately needed for police purposes (Section 3).

The Act's whole final section, Section 4, also clarified a small piece of land extending Cannon Row. That piece of land contained about 63 yards and was believed to be public land vested in the Westminster district's Board of Works. The piece of land was surrounded by lands vested or about to be vested in the Receiver, but it was unclear if the Board of Works had the powers to transfer that piece of land to the Receiver - the Act agreed to allow the Board to transfer the land to the Receiver.

Sources

United Kingdom Acts of Parliament 1887
Police legislation in the United Kingdom